In military terms, 148th Division or 148th Infantry Division may refer to:

 148th Division (People's Republic of China)
 148th Reserve Division (Wehrmacht)